Zinda Kaul (1884–1965) was an Indian poet, writer and teacher. He composed in Persian, Hindi, Urdu and Kashmiri. Kaul also translated works of Kashmiri into English, Persian and Hindi.

Personal life 
Zinda Kaul was also known as MasterJi by his students and friends.

Kaul was born on August 1884 in Habbakadal, a city in Srinagar into a Kashmiri Pandit family. His father, Lakshman Pandit, was indifferent to his formal education and Kaul had to face many difficulties in his life. He was a school teacher for a long time. After that, he worked as a clerk. In 1939, Kaul retired from the Publicity office of Kashmir as a translator.

Death
He died in Jammu in the winter of 1965.

Literary work 
Zinda Kaul was the first Kashmiri poet to win the Sahitya Academy award in 1956, for his book of poetry compilations Sumran. It was first published in Devanagari, and later the government had it printed in the Persio-Arabic script. The Sahitya Academy of India gave Kaul an award of five thousand rupees for this book.

Kaul initially wrote in Persian, Hindi, and Urdu. His first poem was Unity and Sympathy, written in 1896 and recited it at the Sanatan Dharm Sabha meeting in Srinagar.
Masterji started writing in Kashmiri in 1942. In his Kashmiri poetry, he has written primarily on devotion, philosophy and peace. Masterji's poetry has been published in all these four languages. However, he made his name by writing in Kashmiri.

Kaul composed poetry only for his own pleasure. Critics say that his poems in Kashmiri were better than those in Hindi and Urdu.

Translations 
Zinda Kaul translated the works of the mystic Kashmiri writer and poet Nand Ram Parmanand into English, in three volumes.

Award 
 Sahitya Academy Award for Kashmiri literature (1956), for Sumran.

See also 
List of Sahitya Akademi Award winners for Kashmiri

Notes and references

External links 
Zinda Kaul by Braj Kachru
Sumeran (Master Zinda Kaul)

Kashmiri people
Kashmiri poets
Kashmiri Hindus
Kashmiri Pandits
1884 births
1965 deaths
Recipients of the Sahitya Akademi Award in Kashmiri
20th-century Indian poets
Poets in British India